Lowell is a lunar impact crater that lies just beyond the western limb of the Moon. It is embedded within the northwestern part of the Montes Rook mountain ring of the Mare Orientale impact basin. This portion of the Moon's far side is sometimes brought into view of the Earth during periods of favorable libration and lighting, although it is only seen from the edge.

The crater is circular in outline, with a well-defined edge. A small crater lies along the edge of the eastern rim. The inner wall is wider along the western side, and there are some terrace structures. In the middle of the crater is a central peak on the interior floor.

Satellite craters

By convention these features are identified on lunar maps by placing the letter on the side of the crater midpoint that is closest to Lowell.

References 

 
 
 
 
 
 
 
 
 
 
 
 

Impact craters on the Moon